Emgwen Constituency is an electoral constituency in Kenya. It is one of six constituencies of Nandi County. The constituency was established for the 1997 elections.

Members of Parliament

Wards

References 

Constituencies in Nandi County
Constituencies in Rift Valley Province
1997 establishments in Kenya
Constituencies established in 1997